Beechdale, originally named Gypsy Lane Estate, is a housing estate in Walsall, England, that was developed predominantly during the 1950s and 1960s.

Education
Beechdale Infant School for 5-7 year olds opened on the estate in 1955 in Remington Road, followed by the 7-11 junior school in 1959. These schools later merged to form a single primary school and remained open until July 2006, being demolished in early 2007.

Hatherton Lane Primary School (which originally opened to infants in 1956 and juniors in 1960) is now the only primary school in the area.

Just to the north of the estate is Bloxwich Academy, which opened as Frank F. Harrison Community School in 1965.

Sport
Beechdale Football Club, the local football team, play and train on a football pitch within the estate. The team has had considerable success in recent years within its division. There are also popular pool, snooker and darts teams on the estate.

Notable people
Noddy Holder, the lead singer of Slade, grew up on the estate after moving there as a child from Caldmore; his parents were among the estate's original residents in the 1950s. Another famous former resident of the estate are Rob Halford of Judas Priest and Martin Degville of Sigue Sigue Sputnik.

Public transport
Trolleybuses once ran into the estate when it was originally called Gypsy Lane Estate. Currently all public transport services are provided by bus and operated by National Express West Midlands.

References

Walsall